The Grand Hotel is a former hotel which still stands in the English coastal village of Mundesley in the county of Norfolk, United Kingdom. The building is now called the Grand Norfolk Holiday Apartments.

Location 
The defunct hotel is situated on the B1159 main coast road that runs from Cromer to Caister-on-Sea. The building stands on a cliff top highpoint in the village and is a dominant landmark.

History 
This Victorian hotel was built in 1897 along with the Manor Hotel in Mundesley effort to develop into a fashionable seaside resort at the time that nearby Cromer had grown into prominence as a resort. With the arrival of the railway to Mundesley a development company was set up to instigate the expansion of Mundesley. This company was called ''The East Coast Estates Company'. The Grand Hotel was to offer luxury accommodation to the Victorian traveller, most of whom were expected to arrive by train at the village's brand new railway station.

Commandeered 
During the Second World War, like many hotels along this part of the coast, the hotel was commandeered for military use. At the end of the war it was returned to private use. The hotel was renamed the Hotel Continental.

End of an era
Following the war years, the closure of the railway station, the decline of the area as a fashionable tourist destination and the availability of cheap package holidays abroad, the hotel closed it doors. The hotel was then converted into apartments and became Trafalgar Court. With a complex ownership structure and legal disputes over management funding, the building fell into disrepair. After an injection of money the building has undergone extensive refurbishment.

References 

Hotel buildings completed in 1867
Mundesley
Hotels in North Norfolk
Defunct hotels in Norfolk
Hotels established in 1876
1876 establishments in England
1867 establishments in England